is a Japanese novel series, written by Kaoru Hayamine and illustrated by K2 Shōkai. Kodansha have published fifteen volumes since March 2002 under their Aoitori Bunko children's imprint. A theatrical original video animation (OVA) adaptation of the first novel, Kaitō Queen wa Circus ga Osuki, premiered in Japan in June 2022. A new anime adaptation titled Kaitō Queen no Yūga na Kyūka has been announced.

Characters

RD

Media

Original video animation
In July 2021, it was announced that the series' first novel, would be adapted as a theatrical original video animation (OVA). It is produced by East Fish Studio and directed by Saori Den, with scripts written by Mariko Kunisawa, character designs by Kumiko Kawashima, and music composed by Moe Hyūga. It premiered in Japan on June 17, 2022. The film's theme song is "Gyakuten no Regina" by Little Black Dress. Sentai Filmworks has licensed the OVA outside of Asia.

A new anime adaptation titled Kaitō Queen no Yūga na Kyūka was announced on March 12, 2023.

References

External links
 
 

2002 Japanese novels
Anime and manga based on novels
Japanese adventure novels
Japanese children's novels
Kodansha books
Sentai Filmworks